Carol Thomas  (née McCune; born 5 June 1955) is an English former footballer and was the second captain of England, taking over from Sheila Parker in 1976. She is the most successful captain of the England women's national team in terms of tournament successes and recognised as one of the genuine but unsung pioneers of the modern women's game. Thomas became captain at the age of 21 and held that position until her retirement with a then-record 56 caps in 1985. She remained the longest, continuous serving captain for a period of 26 years before being overtaken by Faye White in 2011.

Thomas was a sturdy right-sided defender, who refused offers of professionalism from Italy and New Zealand in order to maintain the strict amateur status which was enforced by the Women's Football Association at that time. She was a leading women's footballing figure in the north of England and in particular her home area of Yorkshire, appearing in and on local and national media and, when on tours, the foreign media.

Club career
Thomas's first competitive game was at the age of 11 in September 1966, having been inspired by the World Cup success of that year, for BOCM Ladies as a traditional right winger. She was also encouraged by watching her father Percy, who had been a keen amateur footballer and a founder member of a local team called Air Street United. Her talents were quickly recognised and she was snapped up by Reckitts Ladies, then under the tutelage of Flo Bilton. A move to local rivals Hull Brewery Ladies followed, gaining recognition with the Hull and District Representative team, the North of England squad and an eventual England call up.

At club level she made occasional guest appearances for Tottenham Hotspur Ladies, and for a season played for Preston Rangers, Lancashire. Several seasons at CP Doncaster Ladies followed before finishing her England representative career with Rowntrees Ladies.

International career
Thomas was first called up to the England squad by England manager Tommy Tranter in November 1974 for a 2–0 win over France at Plough Lane. She made two substitute appearances before becoming the first choice right back. Thomas retained her place under Tranter's successor Martin Reagan and, aside from one game, became an ever-present until September 1985.

On 31 October 1978, Thomas became the first captain to lead out an England women's side to play on a Football League First Division ground at The Dell, home of Southampton F.C.  In front of a then record crowd of 5,471, England beat Belgium 3–0 with Thomas providing the cross for Elaine Badrock to open the scoring for the home nation.

In 1981 she became the first captain to lead an England women's team outside of Europe, when they took part in that year's Mundialito tournament in Japan. Altogether, she led England in seven consecutive tournaments, playing all 29 games, winning 20 and only losing only 5, two of which were on penalty shoot-outs, and conceding less than a goal a game on average. During that period she led the England team to two tournament victories in the 1976 Pony Home Championship and the 1985 Mundialito and to a runners up position in the 1984 UEFA Women's Championship.

International tournaments

* Played in the first three winning group games before retiring.

Her commitment and dedication to her England captaincy ensured that following her marriage to husband Alan in July 1979, two days later she flew out to Italy with the rest of the England squad to take part in that year's unofficial European Cup. In total, Thomas won 56 caps in an 11-year England career, serving as captain for either 49 (Guinness Records), 50 (England Football Online archives, presumptive), or 51 (National Football Museum) of those matches. As women's international tournaments were "unofficial, invitation or in their infancy", records digress. In March 1985 England beat Scotland 4–0 at Deepdale in Preston, Lancashire and Thomas was presented with her 50th cap by Tom Finney after the game. Later in 1985, following the success of that year's Mundialito and having successfully led her England team to three straight victories in the 1984–87 UEFA Cup, at the age of 30, Thomas retired from the international scene and football to have her first child. Sue Law took over as England's right back while Debbie Bampton inherited the captaincy.

International record

Recognition and achievements

In 1974 she was invited to the first all-women coaching course held at the then national footballing centre, Lilleshall.  Thomas, along with Jane Talbot and Pauline Dickie, gained her FA Preliminary Badge, becoming one of only three who passed the course, thereby becoming the first qualified women coaches in England. Her performances on the course resulted in her call up to the England squad that November when she made her first international appearance.

By the late 1970s her achievements were being acknowledged outside the game.  In 1978 and 1979 she was invited by the BBC to star in the popular sports show, 'Superstars', to promote the women's game. As an ambassador for the women's game, in 1983 she received the Vaux Breweries North Sportswoman of the Year Silver Star Award.  In 1984 she became the first woman player to be interviewed on national breakfast television appearing opposite Frank Bough and Selina Scott following the defeat against Sweden in the 1984 European Championship Final. In 1985 she was awarded the Sports Council Sports Award.

Post international retirement, in 1986, she became the first woman footballer to have an entry in the Guinness Book of Records, as the then-most international caps for a woman, with entries to follow in subsequent years. In November 2021 Thomas was inducted into the English Football Hall of Fame.

In April 2022, a plaque was unveiled in Hull in her honour at the East Riding County Football Association building.

Thomas was awarded the British Empire Medal (BEM) in the 2022 Birthday Honours for services to association football and charity.

Return to grassroots football

In 1993, after the birth of her second child, Thomas came out of retirement to help establish local club AFC Preston with playing and coaching. She also set up a soccer club (which still runs to this day) for youngsters aged five to 10 years from her village and the surrounding rural area. She also helped her husband coach their sons from the under 7 age group to under 18 level.

When the East Riding County FA created its first women's representative team in 1995, Thomas was asked to work with the coaching staff and captain the side. She remained playing at this level until 2002. In 2004, she made her final move to Bransburton Ladies.

Retirement

In 2009 after 43 years in football Thomas retired. She now spreads her time between her family (which includes two footballing grandsons) and long distance trekking. 
 
A keen walker, by 2015 she had completed all 214 ‘Wainwrights’, undertaken the National Three Peaks Challenge in 24 hours and completed the Coast to Coast Walk. She has trekked at high altitude, including the Andes, Himalaya and Atlas Mountains, having already climbed several mountains and traversed numerous high passes in Nepal, Peru, Morocco and India many at heights in excess of 18,000 ft.

References

1955 births
Living people
English women's footballers
England women's international footballers
Footballers from Kingston upon Hull
Women's association football defenders
Fylde Ladies F.C. players
Recipients of the British Empire Medal